The Lion's Cup (named the Emeron Cup in its first two years) was a WTA Tour tennis tournament held from 1978 until 1985, in Tokyo, Japan.  The event was held on indoor hard courts in 1978 and 1979 before moving to indoor carpet courts.  Only a singles event was contested.

Champions

External links
WTA Tour Final Results: 1971-2007

 
Defunct tennis tournaments in Japan
WTA Tour
Hard court tennis tournaments
Carpet court tennis tournaments
Indoor tennis tournaments
Sports competitions in Tokyo
Recurring sporting events established in 1978
Recurring sporting events disestablished in 1985
1978 establishments in Japan
1985 disestablishments in Japan
Women in Tokyo